Johnny Wilson (born April 3, 2001) is an American football wide receiver for the Florida State Seminoles. He previously played at Arizona State.

Early life and high school
Wilson grew up in the Pacoima neighborhood of Los Angeles, California and attended Calabasas High School in Calabasas, California. He was rated a four-star recruit and the fifth-best wide receiver prospect in the nation by 247Sports.com and initially committed to play college football at Oregon during the summer before his senior year from 35 total scholarship offers. As a senior, Wilson caught 37 passes for 606 yards and eight touchdowns. Late in that season, he flipped his commitment to Arizona State.

College career
Wilson began his college career at Arizona State. As a true freshman, he played in three games and caught six for 89 yards while maintaining a redshirt on the season. Wilson caught 12 passes for 154 yards and one touchdown in 2021. After the season, he entered the NCAA transfer portal.

Wilson ultimately transferred to Florida State.

References

External links
Arizona State Sun Devils bio
Florida State Seminoles bio

Living people
Players of American football from California
American football wide receivers
Florida State Seminoles football players
Arizona State Sun Devils football players
Year of birth missing (living people)